Fontaine-Michalon is a Station of Paris RER, of the city of Antony.

Railway stations in France opened in 1854
Réseau Express Régional stations in Hauts-de-Seine